Triantafyllia (before 1988: Τριανταφυλλιές - Triantafyllies, before 1927: Μαχμουτζή - Machmoutzi) is a village and a community in Visaltia municipality, Serres regional unit, Central Macedonia, Greece. The population was 1,124 in 1981, but had dropped to 702 by 2011.

References

External links
 "Triandafilleai, Greece" International Gazetteer from Falling Rain Genomics, Inc. 

Populated places in Serres (regional unit)